Raimo Pärssinen (born 1956) is a Swedish social democratic politician who has been a member of the Riksdag since 1998. He is of Finnish descent.

References

Raimo Pärssinen (S)

Members of the Riksdag from the Social Democrats
1956 births
Living people
Members of the Riksdag 2002–2006
Swedish people of Finnish descent